A Touch of Today is a 1966 studio album by singer Nancy Wilson arranged by Sid Feller and Oliver Nelson and produced by Dave Cavanaugh.

Reception

The initial Billboard review from May 7, 1966 commented that "Miss Wilson's warmth, feeling and musical understanding highlight new dimensions of today's pop hits".

John Bush reviewed the album for Allmusic and wrote that though Wilson's voice was "as strong and pliable as ever...Wilson isn't always right for this material, as her attempt to sound exuberant on Stevie Wonder's "Uptight (Everything's Alright)" displays". Bush praised Wilson's performances on "The Shadow of Your Smile," "Call Me," "And I Love Her", "Yesterday," and "Goin' out of My Head". Bush concluded that A Touch of Today "...is a solid album adrift in a period of lesser efforts by great singers".

Track listing 
 "You've Got Your Troubles" (Roger Cook, Roger Greenaway)  – 2:26
 "And I Love Him" (John Lennon, Paul McCartney)  – 2:20
 "Uptight (Everything's Alright)" (Henry Cosby, Stevie Wonder, Sylvia Moy)  – 1:57
 "Have a Heart" (Gene DiNovi, Johnny Mercer)  – 2:27
 "Before the Rain" (Edward Yellin, Ralph Carmichael, Sue Raney)  – 2:12
 "The Shadow of Your Smile (Love Theme From "The Sandpiper")" (Johnny Mandel, Paul Francis Webster)  – 2:00
 "Call Me" (Tony Hatch)  – 2:15
 "Yesterday" (Lennon, McCartney)  – 2:05
 "Wasn't It Wonderful" (Eddie Pola, George Wyle)  – 1:58
 "You're Gonna Hear From Me" (Andre Previn, Dory Previn)  – 2:44
 "No One Else But You" (Arthur Altman, Dany Delmin, Jimmy Walter)  – 2:10
 "Goin' Out of My Head" (Bobby Weinstein, Teddy Randazzo)  – 2:05

Personnel 
 Nancy Wilson - vocals
 Sid Feller, Oliver Nelson – arranger
 George Jerman - cover photography
 Janice May - liner notes
 Dave Cavanaugh - producer

References

1966 albums
Nancy Wilson (jazz singer) albums
Albums arranged by Sid Feller
Albums arranged by Oliver Nelson
Albums produced by Dave Cavanaugh
Capitol Records albums